The 2003 Borough Council of Wellingborough election took place on 1 May 2003 to elect members of Borough Council of Wellingborough in Northamptonshire, UK. This was on the same day as other local elections.

References

2003 English local elections
May 2003 events in the United Kingdom
2007
2000s in Northamptonshire